Alvin Brown (born 1961) is a US politician.

Alvin Brown may also refer to:

Alvin Brown (boxer) (born 1969), American boxer
H. Alvin Brown, namesake of H. Alvin Brown–C. C. Stroud Field

See also
Al Brown (disambiguation)